G3 is a concert tour organized by guitarist Joe Satriani featuring him alongside two other guitarists. Since its inception in 1995, G3 has toured most years and has featured many guitarists, including Steve Vai (Satriani's former student), Eric Johnson, Kenny Wayne Shepherd, Yngwie Malmsteen, John Petrucci, Robert Fripp, Paul Gilbert, Steve Morse, Steve Lukather, Uli Jon Roth, Michael Schenker, Adrian Legg, Phil Collen and many other special guests, including Tony MacAlpine, Johnny Hiland, Keith More, Chris Duarte, Andy Timmons, Neal Schon, Gary Hoey, Brian May, Billy Gibbons, Johnny A, George Lynch, Patrick Rondat, Guthrie Govan, Alejandro Silva, and Eric Sardinas.

1996

The first tour took place in 1996. The North American G3 tour featured Joe Satriani, Steve Vai, and Eric Johnson. Performances were held from October 11, 1996 to November 8, 1996. Kenny Wayne Shepherd and Adrian Legg were the opening acts.

There were special guests on this tour, who included Neal Schon in San Francisco, Gary Hoey in San Diego, Chris Duarte in Austin and San Antonio, George Lynch in Phoenix, and Andy Timmons in Dallas. Al and Janie Hendrix (Jimi Hendrix's father and stepsister) came backstage on the last date of the G3 Tour in Hendrix's home town of Seattle, WA.

1997

Toured North America and Europe. Michel Cusson played the first two shows in Quebec City and Montreal before Kenny Wayne Shepherd came aboard.

1998

Toured Europe.

Patrick Rondat was also present on the G3 Tour dates in France.

2000

Toured Rentak Rhythm of Asia Festival (Bukit Jalil) – Kuala Lumpur, MY. Featured a reunion of the first G3 Tour lineup on October 21, 2000 at the Rhythm of Asia Festival – Kuala Lumpur, MY. Slide guitarist Eric Sardinas opened.

2001–2002

G3 2001 featured Joe Satriani and Steve Vai up with Dream Theater's John Petrucci, who wrote an entire set of new instrumental music for the tour, touring North America.

2003

Joe Satriani, Steve Vai and Yngwie Malmsteen toured North America.

2004

G3 toured Europe, Mexico and South America in 2004 with Joe Satriani, Steve Vai and Robert Fripp.

2005

The 2005 G3 tour featured John Petrucci, Steve Vai and Joe Satriani touring Japan and the United States. It was recorded on May 8 at the Tokyo Forum, Japan.

2006

The first 2006 G3 tour featured John Petrucci, Eric Johnson and Joe Satriani. Performances were held from October 16, 2006 to October 29, 2006 across Latin America.

The second 2006 G3 tour featured John Petrucci, Steve Vai and Joe Satriani. Performances were held across Australia from November 29, 2006 to December 8, 2006.

2007

The G3 2007 tour featured Paul Gilbert, John Petrucci and Joe Satriani. Shows were held from March 14 to April 14.  At the last show of the tour during the song "Glasgow Kiss" Paul Gilbert's band came out wearing kilts and did a small dance.

The G3 Jam featured Johnny A. at the Orpheum Theatre in Boston, MA.

2012

The G3 2012 tour featured Steve Lukather in Australia/Steve Morse in Europe, Joe Satriani and Steve Vai.

2016
The G3 2016 tour featured Joe Satriani and Steve Vai and the Aristocrats. Shows were held in various cities in Italy and Germany from July 2, 2016 to July 13, 2016.

2018

The G3 2018 tour featured John Petrucci, Uli Jon Roth in Europe/Phil Collen in the States and Joe Satriani.

G3 statistics
Dream Theater, Scorpions, and Racer X are the only bands that have had two of their members on G3 tour: John Petrucci on guitar and Mike Portnoy on drums (2001, 2002, 2005, 2006 & 2007), John Petrucci on guitar and Mike Mangini on drums (2012,2018), Michael Schenker and Uli Jon Roth both on guitars (1998), and Paul Gilbert and Bruce Bouillet both on guitar (2007).

Alcatrazz has also had two members represented on the G3 tour: Yngwie Malmsteen and Steve Vai. The David Lee Roth Band has had four members touring with G3: Steve Vai, Billy Sheehan, Matt Bissonette and Greg Bissonette.

Robert Fripp, Eric Johnson, Steve Morse, John Petrucci and Uli Jon Roth are the only guitarists (excluding Joe Satriani and Steve Vai) who have played on the G3 tour more than once:

 John Petrucci – 6 times
 Eric Johnson – 3 times
 Robert Fripp – twice
 Steve Morse – twice
 Uli Jon Roth - twice

Headline guitarists 
 1996 (North America): Joe Satriani, Steve Vai, Eric Johnson with Kenny Wayne Shepherd and Adrian Legg on select dates
 1997 (North America): Joe Satriani, Steve Vai, Kenny Wayne Shepherd, Robert Fripp
 1997 (Europe): Joe Satriani, Steve Vai, Adrian Legg
 1998 (Europe): Joe Satriani, Michael Schenker, Uli Jon Roth, Keith More (Guest on Glasgow, Birmingham and Croydon), Brian May (On Wembley Arena)
 2000 (Rentak Rhythm Of Asia) : Joe Satriani, Steve Vai, Eric Johnson
 2001 (North America): Joe Satriani, Steve Vai, John Petrucci, Steve Morse (guest on 22.7., Orlando, Florida),
 2003 (North America): Joe Satriani, Steve Vai, Yngwie Malmsteen
 2004 (Europe/South America): Joe Satriani, Steve Vai, Robert Fripp.
 2005 (Japan): Joe Satriani, Steve Vai, John Petrucci, Marty Friedman (Although he did not appear in the credits)
 2006 (South America): Joe Satriani, John Petrucci, Eric Johnson
 2006 (Australia): Joe Satriani, Steve Vai, John Petrucci
 2007 (North America): Joe Satriani, John Petrucci, Paul Gilbert
 2012 (Australia/New Zealand): Joe Satriani, Steve Vai, Steve Lukather
 2012 (Europe): Joe Satriani, Steve Vai, Steve Morse, Al Di Meola (Guest on July 31 in Prague)
 2012 (South America): Joe Satriani, John Petrucci, Steve Morse, Steve Lukather (Lukather replaced Morse on October 23, 2012)
 2016 (Europe): Joe Satriani, Steve Vai, the Aristocrats.
 2018: (USA) Joe Satriani, John Petrucci, Phil Collen
 2018: (Europe) Joe Satriani, John Petrucci, Uli Jon Roth

Discography
G3: Live in Concert (1997)
G3: Live in Denver (2004)
G3: Rockin' in the Free World (2004)
G3: Live in Tokyo (2005)

References

External links
 Official G3 website
 G3 at MySpace

 
Concert tours
Heavy metal festivals in the United States
Rock festivals in the United States